The New Yorker Lions are an American Football team from Braunschweig, Germany. Until late 2010, the team was known as the Braunschweig Lions.

Under this name, the Lions became the most successful American football club in Germany, winning seven German Bowls as well as two Eurobowls. From 1997 to 2008, the team played in twelve consecutive German Bowls. After a number of less successful years the club won four more German titles from 2013 to 2016 as well as four more Eurobowls from 2015 to 2018.

History 

The Braunschweig Lions were formed in 1987 and the new team entered the tier-three Regionalliga Nord for that season, where it came third. The Lions were nevertheless promoted to the 2nd Bundesliga, now the German Football League 2, for the following season and spent the next six years at this level. The team was never outstanding at this level for the first five years, only finishing once with a percentage above 0.500 in this era.

In 1993, the Lions finally managed to win their division and earn promotion to the American Football Bundesliga, now the German Football League. The team performed well at this level in its first season there, finishing fourth and qualifying for the play-offs, where they were knocked-out in the quarter-finals. The following season, 1995, saw the club miss the play-offs but in 1996 they returned and reached the semi-finals, losing to the Hamburg Blue Devils and beginning what was to become a strong football rivalry in the following decade.

The year 1997 saw the beginning of the golden era of the Braunschweig Lions and the most successful era of any American football club in Germany to date. The Lions were to play in every one of the next twelve German Bowls.

The club won the first three of those, the first one against the Cologne Crocodiles and title number two and three against the Hamburg Blue Devils, the latest in front of a record crowd of over 30,000 in Hamburg. That year, the Lions also took out the Eurobowl, once more playing a final against the Blue Devils there, too. The next five seasons, the Lions were to lose five German Bowls in a row. The 2000 edition saw revenge for the Cologne Crocodiles, the following three were all lost to the Blue Devils. The fifth and final loss came to the Berlin Adler. In this era, the only title the club did manage to win was another Eurobowl in 2003.

The Lions then once more turned fortunes around and managed to set a new record by winning the next four German Bowls in a row. In the four finals, they faced four different opponents. In 2005, the Blue Devils were their Bowl opponent for a sixth time, in 2006 and 2007, it had to face opposition from the southern division, the Marburg Mercenaries and the Stuttgart Scorpions, while the final victory came against the Kiel Baltic Hurricanes in 2008.

After winning those four consecutive titles, they faced drastic restructuring in 2009 and did therefore not qualify for the play-offs at all, but returned in 2010, when they lost to the Marburg Mercenaries in the quarter finals.

In March 2011, the club announced that the team would carry a new name for the 2011 season. Their name is shared with the fashion label NewYorker, a sponsor of the team. The Lions had an average 2011 season, in which they won only four season games and finished well clear of the play-off ranks. In 2012, the club came sixth in the northern division of the GFL and failed to qualify for the play-offs.

In 2013, the Lions returned to their old dominance, winning 13 of their 14 regular season games as well as the GFL Northern Division title. After play-off wins against the Rhein-Neckar Bandits and the Kiel Baltic Hurricanes the team reached its first German Bowl since 2008, which they won by a point against the Dresden Monarchs.

In 2014, the club took part in a new European competition, the BIG6 European Football League, which consisted of three teams from Germany, two from Austria and one from Switzerland, the clubs being Berlin Adler, New Yorker Lions, Dresden Monarchs, Raiffeisen Vikings Vienna, Swarco Raiders Tirol and the Calanda Broncos. The two best teams of this competition  advanced to the Eurobowl XXVIII, where the Lions lost 20–17 to the Berlin Adler. In the GFL the Lions won the northern division once more in 2014 and defeated the Munich Cowboys 69–28 in the quarter-finals and the Cologne Falcons 52–3 in the semi finals of the play-offs to reach the 2014 German Bowl. The Lions won the championship game against the Schwäbisch Hall Unicorns 47–9 and took out their ninth national title, staying undefeated in the GFL that season.

In 2015, the Lions won their third Eurobowl, again defeating the Schwäbisch Hall Unicorns. The team also won the northern division of the GFL once more and defeated the Saarland Hurricanes in the quarter-finals and the Allgäu Comets in the semi-finals of the play-offs, facing the Schwäbisch Hall Unicorns next in the German Bowl once more, which the Lions won 41–31.

Teams
Apart from the first team, the club also fields a reserve side, two youth teams, the Junior Lions and the Red Cubs 94, a Flag Football team and a women's team, the Lady Lions. All six teams are part of the mother club 1. FFC Braunschweig.

Honours
 Eurobowl
 Champions: (6) 1999, 2003, 2015–2018
 Runners-up: (2) 2002, 2014
 German Bowl
 Champions: (12) 1997–1999, 2005–2008, 2013–2016, 2019
 Runners-up: (6) 2000–2004, 2017
 EFL
 Participations: (7) 1998–2000, 2002, 2003, 2006, 2009
 BIG6 European Football League
 Participations: (4) 2014–2018
 GFL
 Northern Division champions: (15) 1998, 1999, 2002–2007, 2013–2019
 Play-off qualification: (23) 1994, 1996–2008, 2010, 2013–2019, 2021
 League membership: (26) 1994–present
 GFL2
 Northern Division champions: 1993

German Bowl appearances

The club's appearances in the German Bowl:

Eurobowl appearances
The club's appearances in the Eurobowl:

Recent seasons
Recent seasons of the Lions:

 QF = Quarter finals.
 SF = Semi finals.
 GB = German Bowl

Hall of Fame

The following players and coaches have been inducted into the club's hall of fame:

References

External links 

  Official website
  German Football League official website
  Football History Historic American football tables from Germany

American football teams in Germany
German Football League teams
American football teams established in 1987
Sport in Lower Saxony
Sport in Braunschweig
1987 establishments in West Germany
Organisations based in Braunschweig